Stephen J. Turnovsky (born 1941) is a New Zealand economist and the Ford and Louisa Van Voorhis Professor of Political Economy at the University of Washington. He is one of the most highly cited economists in the world. As of November 2015, Research Papers in Economics ranks him as the 32nd most influential economist.  RePEc reports that he has published over 5000 pages in academic journals, making him one of the top 5 most prolific economists.

A native of Wellington, New Zealand, Turnosky attended Victoria University of Wellington, majoring in mathematics and economics. After earning a bachelor's degree in 1962, and a master's in 1963, he continued his education at Harvard University, receiving his Ph.D. In 1968.

Turnovsky's economic interests are largely centered around macroeconomics. His most recent publishings are "The Distributional Consequences of Trade Liberalization: Consumption Tariff versus Investment Tariff Reduction" and "Population Size Effects in the Structural Development of England". Turnovsky also serves on various advisory boards for a number of journals. He currently serves as a Co-editor of Macroeconomics Dynamics and as an Associate Editor of the Journal of Public Economic Theory.

References

External links 
 Website at the University of Washington

1941 births
Living people
New Zealand economists
Victoria University of Wellington alumni
Harvard Graduate School of Arts and Sciences alumni
University of Washington faculty
Fellows of the Econometric Society